The 1969 World Table Tennis Championships – Corbillon Cup (women's team) was the 23rd edition of the women's team championship.

The Soviet Union won the gold medal, Romania won the silver medal and Japan won the bronze medal.

Medalists

Second stage

Final tables

Group A

Group B

Third-place playoff

Final

See also
List of World Table Tennis Championships medalists

References

-
1969 in women's table tennis
Table